Tachina vulgata is a species of fly in the genus Tachina of the family Tachinidae that is endemic to South America.

References

Insects described in 1853
Diptera of South America
vulgata